Jon Judkins (born March 3, 1964) is an American basketball coach who is the current head coach of the Utah Tech Trailblazers men's basketball team.

Playing career
After a season at Dixie College (now Utah Tech University), Judkins transferred to Utah State where he was the first Aggie to post a triple-double, and was part of the team's 1988 NCAA tournament bid.

Coaching career
After graduation, Judkins joined the coaching staff at Snow College, where he was an assistant until 1993, when he was elevated to head coach. Over the next 12 seasons, he posted a 284–128 record before joining Utah Tech in 2005, guiding the team through its transition from junior college to NCAA status, first in Division II and in 2020, Division I as the Trailblazers join the Western Athletic Conference.

Overall, Judkins has guided Utah Tech to 11-straight winning seasons, six Pacific West Conference championships, and eight NCAA Division II Tournament appearances.

Personal
Judkins' brother, Jeff, is a former National Basketball Association (NBA) player and current head coach of the BYU Cougars women's basketball team.

Head coaching record

References

1964 births
Living people
American men's basketball players
Basketball coaches from Utah
Basketball players from Salt Lake City
Utah Tech Trailblazers men's basketball coaches
Utah Tech Trailblazers men's basketball players
Utah State Aggies men's basketball players
Snow Badgers men's basketball coaches
Sportspeople from Salt Lake City